Keith Wisniewski (born October 25, 1981) is an American professional mixed martial artist currently competing in the Welterweight division. He has competed for the UFC, IFL, M-1 Global, Ironheart Crown, and BodogFIGHT.

Mixed martial arts career

Ultimate Fighting Championship
Wisniewski made his UFC debut at UFC 56 against Nick Thompson. He lost a unanimous decision.

Post-UFC
Following his release from the UFC, Wisniewski lost four straight fights but then went on a six-fight winning streak that included victories over UFC veterans Pete Spratt and Chris Wilson, leading to him being re-signed with the promotion.

Return to UFC
Wisniewski faced Josh Neer in his UFC return on October 1, 2011 at UFC Live: Cruz vs. Johnson. He lost the fight via TKO (doctor stoppage) at the conclusion of the second round.

Wisniewski faced newcomer Chris Clements on April 21, 2012 at UFC 145. He lost the fight via split decision after three back and forth rounds.

Wisniewski was slated to face Marcelo Guimares on September 4, 2013 at UFC Fight Night 28.  However, Guimaraes pulled out of the bout citing an injury and was replaced by Ivan Jorge. He lost the fight via unanimous decision and was subsequently released from the promotion.

Mixed martial arts record

|-
| Loss
| align=center| 28–15–1
| Ivan Jorge
| Decision (unanimous)
| UFC Fight Night: Teixeira vs. Bader
| 
| align=center| 3
| align=center| 5:00
| Belo Horizonte, Brazil
| 
|-
| Loss
| align=center| 28–14–1
| Chris Clements
| Decision (split)
| UFC 145
| 
| align=center| 3
| align=center| 5:00
| Atlanta, Georgia, United States
| 
|-
| Loss
| align=center| 28–13–1
| Josh Neer
| TKO (doctor stoppage)
| UFC Live: Cruz vs. Johnson
| 
| align=center| 2
| align=center| 5:00
| Washington, D.C., United States
| 
|-
| Win
| align=center| 28–12–1
| Chris Wilson
| Decision (unanimous) 
| Hoosier FC 7: Validation 
| 
| align=center| 3
| align=center| 5:00
| Valparaiso, Indiana, United States
| 
|-
| Win
| align=center| 27–12–1
| Randy Crawford
| KO (knee)
| Cutthroat MMA: Supremacy 2
| 
| align=center| 1
| align=center| 0:21
| Hammond, Indiana, United States
| 
|-
| Win
| align=center| 26–12–1
| Ted Worthington
| Submission (heel hook) 
| Xtreme Fighting Organization 35
| 
| align=center| 2
| align=center| 3:56
| Chicago, Illinois, United States
| 
|-
| Win
| align=center| 25–12–1
| Pete Spratt
| Submission (rear-naked choke) 
| Hoosier FC 2: It's On 
| 
| align=center| 1
| align=center| 4:07
| Hammond, Indiana, United States
| 
|-
| Win
| align=center| 24–12–1
| Tristan Yunker
| TKO (punches) 
| War in the Yard
| 
| align=center| 2
| align=center| 1:12
| Anderson, Indiana, United States
| 
|-
| Win
| align=center| 23–12–1
| Johnny Davis
| Submission (rear-naked choke)
| C3: Corral Combat Classic 2
| 
| align=center| 1
| align=center| 2:00
| Hammond, Indiana, United States
| 
|-
| Loss
| align=center| 22–12–1
| Carlo Prater
| Decision (split)
| Art of War 3
| 
| align=center| 3
| align=center| 5:00
| Dallas, Texas, United States
| 
|-
| Loss
| align=center| 22–11–1
| Erik Oganov
| Decision (split)
| Bodog Fight: USA vs. Russia
| 
| align=center| 3
| align=center| 5:00
| Vancouver, British Columbia, Canada
| 
|-
| Loss
| align=center| 22–10–1
| Rory Markham
| TKO (corner stoppage)
| IFL: World Championship Semifinals
| 
| align=center| 3
| align=center| 4:00
| Portland, Oregon, United States
| 
|-
| Loss
| align=center| 22–9–1
| Jorge Masvidal
| Decision (majority)
| BodogFIGHT: To the Brink of War
| 
| align=center| 3
| align=center| 5:00
| San José, Costa Rica
| 
|-
| Loss
| align=center| 22–8–1
| Nick Thompson
| Decision (unanimous)
| UFC 56: Full Force
| 
| align=center| 3
| align=center| 5:00
| Las Vegas, Nevada, United States
| 
|-
| Win
| align=center| 22–7–1
| Carlo Prater
| Decision (unanimous)
| FFC 15: Fiesta Las Vegas
| 
| align=center| 3
| align=center| 5:00
| Las Vegas, Nevada, United States
| 
|-
| Win
| align=center| 21–7–1
| Musail Allaudinov
| TKO (punches)
| Euphoria: USA vs. Russia
| 
| align=center| 3
| align=center| 1:04
| Atlantic City, New Jersey, United States
| 
|-
| Loss
| align=center| 20–7–1
| Shinya Aoki
| Submission (standing armlock)
| Shooto: 1/29 in Korakuen Hall
| 
| align=center| 1
| align=center| 2:22
| Tokyo, Japan
| 
|-
| Win
| align=center| 20–6–1
| Carlo Prater
| Decision (split)
| Freestyle Fighting Championships 13
| 
| align=center| 3
| align=center| 5:00
| Biloxi, Mississippi, United States
| 
|-
| Win
| align=center| 19–6–1
| Derrick Noble
| Decision (unanimous)
| IHC 8: Ethereal
| 
| align=center| 3
| align=center| 5:00
| Hammond, Indiana, United States
| 
|-
| Win
| align=center| 18–6–1
| Steve Berger
| Decision (unanimous)
| Combat: Do Fighting Challenge 1
| 
| align=center| 3
| align=center| 5:00
| Cicero, Illinois, United States
| 
|-
| Win
| align=center| 17–6–1
| Kyle Jensen
| Submission (rear-naked choke)
| Extreme Challenge 59
| 
| align=center| 1
| align=center| 2:19
| Medina, Minnesota, United States
| 
|-
| Loss
| align=center| 16–6–1
| Jason Black
| Decision
| Xtreme Kage Kombat
| 
| align=center| 3
| align=center| 5:00
| Des Moines, Iowa, United States
| 
|-
| Win
| align=center| 16–5–1
| Chris Moore
| Submission (rear-naked choke)
| IHC 7: The Crucible
| 
| align=center| 1
| align=center| 1:59
| Hammond, Indiana, United States
| 
|-
| Win
| align=center| 15–5–1
| Jorge Santiago
| KO (punches)
| Absolute Fighting Championships 6
| 
| align=center| 3
| align=center| 2:14
| Fort Lauderdale, Florida, United States
| 
|-
| Win
| align=center| 14–5–1
| Danila Veselov
| Submission (guillotine choke)
| M-1 MFC - Russia vs. the World 6
| 
| align=center| 1
| align=center| 1:54
| Moscow, Russia
| 
|-
| Win
| align=center| 13–5–1
| Eddie Sanchez
| Submission (choke)
| TFC 8: Hell Raiser
| 
| align=center| 1
| align=center| N/A
| Toledo, Ohio, United States
| 
|-
| Win
| align=center| 12–5–1
| Nuri Shakir
| Submission (guillotine choke)
| USMMA 3: Ring of Fury
| 
| align=center| 1
| align=center| 0:46
| Boston, Massachusetts, United States
| 
|-
| Win
| align=center| 11–5–1
| Marco Macera
| TKO (punches)
| Battle of New Orleans 4
| 
| align=center| 1
| align=center| 1:32
| Metairie, Louisiana, United States
| 
|-
| Win
| align=center| 10–5–1
| Matt Lee
| TKO (punches)
| USMMA 2: Ring of Fury
| 
| align=center| 2
| align=center| 4:19
| Lowell, Massachusetts, United States
| 
|-
| Loss
| align=center| 9–5–1
| John Renken
| Submission (kneebar)
| HOOKnSHOOT: Relentless
| 
| align=center| 2
| align=center| 1:43
| Evansville, Indiana, United States
| 
|-
| Win
| align=center| 9–4–1
| Eric Pettit
| Submission (rear-naked choke)
| SC 1: The Awakening
| 
| align=center| 1
| align=center| N/A
| Canton, Illinois, United States
| 
|-
| Win
| align=center| 8–4–1
| Jason Glabus
| Submission (choke)
| Chicago Challenge 7
| 
| align=center| 1
| align=center| N/A
| Chicago, Illinois, United States
| 
|-
| Win
| align=center| 7–4–1
| Dale Carson
| Submission (rear-naked choke)
| HOOKnSHOOT: Trial 3
| 
| align=center| 1
| align=center| N/A
| Tell City, Indiana, United States
| 
|-
| Loss
| align=center| 6–4–1
| CJ Fernandes
| TKO (submission to punches)
| TFC 1: Fightzone 1
| 
| align=center| 1
| align=center| 31:30
| Fort Wayne, Indiana, United States
| 
|-
| Win
| align=center| 6–3–1
| Angelo Popofski
| Decision (unanimous)
| HOOKnSHOOT: Millennium
| 
| align=center| 1
| align=center| 15:00
| N/A
| 
|-
| Loss
| align=center| 5–3–1
| Adrian Serrano
| Submission (americana)
| HOOKnSHOOT: Texas Heat
| 
| align=center| 1
| align=center| 6:30
| N/A
| 
|-
| Win
| align=center| 5–2–1
| Pat Heidenreich
| Submission (armbar)
| Night of the Diamonds
| 
| align=center| 1
| align=center| N/A
| align=center| N/A
| 
|-
| Draw
| align=center| 4–2–1
| Jason Glabus
| Draw
| Chicago Challenge 6
| 
| align=center| 1
| align=center| 10:00
| Chicago, Illinois, United States
| 
|-
| Loss
| align=center| 4–2
| Shonie Carter
| KO (spinning back fist)
| Indiana Martial Arts Challenge 3
| 
| align=center| 1
| align=center| 0:40
| Indiana, United States
| 
|-
| Win
| align=center| 4–1
| Jim Rhodes
| Submission (armbar)
| Chicago Challenge 5
| 
| align=center| 1
| align=center| N/A
| Chicago, Illinois, United States
| 
|-
| Win
| align=center| 3–1
| Josh Cate
| Submission (triangle choke)
| Fearless Freestyle Fighting 3
| 
| align=center| 1
| align=center| 5:08
| N/A
| 
|-
| Win
| align=center| 2–1
| Brandon Bledsoe
| Submission (rear-naked choke)
| Fearless Freestyle Fighting 3
| 
| align=center| 1
| align=center| 2:07
| N/A
| 
|-
| Win
| align=center| 1–1
| Robert Humphreys
| Decision (unanimous)
| Fearless Freestyle Fighting 2
| 
| align=center| 1
| align=center| 15:00
| N/A
| 
|-
| Loss
| align=center| 0–1
| Joey Gilbert
| Decision (split)
| JKD: Challenge 2
| 
| align=center| 3
| align=center| 5:00
| Chicago, Illinois, United States
|

References

External links
 
 

American male mixed martial artists
Living people
People from Portage, Indiana
1981 births
Welterweight mixed martial artists
American people of Polish descent
Ultimate Fighting Championship male fighters